Klubi Futbollistik Trepça '89, commonly known as Trepça '89, is a professional football club based in Mitrovica, Kosovo. The club plays in the Football Superleague of Kosovo, which is the top tier of football in the country.

History

Minatori 89
In 1992, The club was founded as Minatori '89. Number 89, symbolizes the year of the 1989 Kosovo miners' strike. In the 2016–17 season they were crowned champions for the first time in the club's history.

Honours

Players

Current squad

Other players under contract

Retired numbers

Personnel

Historical list of coaches

 Gani Sejdiu (Aug 2012 - Sep 2013)
 Arsim Abazi (22 Sep 2013 - Oct 2013)
 Fahredin Durak ( - 22 Mar 2015)
 Afrim Tovërlani (23 Mar 2015 - Jun 2015)
 Arsim Thaqi (24 Jun 2015 - Dec 2015)
 Gani Sejdiu (13 Jan 2016 - May 2016)
 Bekim Shotani (17 Jun 2016 - 15 Sep 2016)
 Veton Çitaku (16 Sep 2016 - 11 Jan 2017)
 Zekirija Ramadani (17 Jan 2017 - 13 Sep 2017)
 Sabit Osmani (14 Sep 2017 - 18 Oct 2017) (caretaker)
 Gani Sejdiu (18 Oct 2017 - 3 Dec 2017)
 Gugash Magani (29 Dec 2017 - 1 Nov 2018)
 Shpëtim Idrizi (4 Aug 2019 - )

Trepça'89 in Europe
Trepça'89 competed in the UEFA Champions League for the first time in the 2017–18 season, entering at the first qualifying round. On 19 June 2017, in Nyon, the draw was held and Trepça'89 were drawn against Faroese side Víkingur Gøta.

UEFA club coefficient ranking

References

External links
KF Trepça'89 at UEFA
KF Trepça'89 at Soccerway

 
Association football clubs established in 1992
Football clubs in Yugoslavia
Football clubs in Kosovo
Sport in Mitrovica, Kosovo
Mining association football teams